Ederzito António Macedo Lopes  (born 22 December 1987), commonly known as Eder, is a Portuguese professional footballer who plays as a forward.

He signed with Académica in 2008 from the lower leagues, and joined Braga four years later. Over seven seasons, he appeared in 143 Primeira Liga matches and scored 38 goals. He also played in Wales, France, Russia and Saudi Arabia, notably winning the 2017–18 Premier League with Lokomotiv Moscow.

A Portugal international since 2012, Eder represented the country at the 2014 World Cup and Euro 2016, winning the latter and also scoring the sole goal in the final.

Club career

Early years
Born in Bissau, Guinea-Bissau, Eder moved to Portugal as a child, and started playing football with Associação Desportiva e Cultural da Adémia in the Coimbra District at the age of 11. He made his senior debut with Oliveira do Hospital and G.D. Tourizense, the latter in the third division and the farm team of Académica de Coimbra.

Académica
Eder made his Primeira Liga debut for Académica on 24 August 2008, in a 0–1 away loss against C.F. Estrela da Amadora. He scored his first goal for the club at the end of the season, netting the Students equalising goal in an eventual 3–1 victory over Associação Naval 1º de Maio.

On 2 May 2010, Eder scored what looked like a winning goal against C.D. Nacional, but the visitors equalised at 3–3 in the 90th minute. On 12 September of the following year, against the same opponent and also in Coimbra, he scored twice in a 4–0 rout. He finished the season with five goals in 16 appearances, and helped the club win its first Portuguese Cup since 1939 after defeating Sporting CP in the final, but he only featured in the earlier rounds of the cup as he was suspended for not reporting to training for several weeks, as interest from other clubs in signing him grew.

Braga
Eder signed with S.C. Braga in summer 2012, for four years. He made his official debut for his new team on 2 September in a 0–2 defeat at F.C. Paços de Ferreira but scored twice late into that month as the Minho Province side defeated Rio Ave F.C. 4–1 at home, contributing one in a 4–4 home draw with S.C. Olhanense.

On 30 November 2012, in the fifth round of the Taça de Portugal, Eder netted the winning goal as Braga defeated FC Porto 2–1, booking a place in the quarter-finals. On 6 January 2013, in a league match against Moreirense FC, he scored the game's only goal shortly after the restart. On 23 February he scored in each half of the local derby against Vitória de Guimarães in a 3–2 win at the Estádio Municipal de Braga, but missed the rest of the campaign after suffering a ligament tear in early March.

In the domestic cup final on 31 May 2015, Eder opened the scoring against Sporting with a penalty after Cédric Soares had been sent off for fouling Djavan, but missed in the penalty shootout in an eventual loss following a 2–2 draw.

Swansea City and Lille
On 28 June 2015, Premier League club Swansea City agreed a fee of around £5 million to sign Eder on a three-year deal. He made his debut on 8 August, playing the final 11 minutes of a 2–2 draw at title holders Chelsea in place of Bafétimbi Gomis.

Having not scored in 15 competitive games for the Swans – only four starts – Eder joined Lille OSC on loan for the remainder of the season. He made his French Ligue 1 debut on 3 February 2016 as a half-time replacement for Yassine Benzia in a 1–0 home win over Stade Malherbe Caen. He scored his first goal four days later, to open a 1–1 draw against Stade Rennais F.C. also at the Stade Pierre-Mauroy.

Eder played the full 90 minutes in the final of the Coupe de la Ligue on 23 April 2016, which ended in a 2–1 loss against Paris Saint-Germain FC. On 24 May, after helping his team finish fifth and qualify to the UEFA Europa League, he signed a permanent four-year contract.

On 2 March 2017, Eder scored the final goal (four minutes into injury time after 90 minutes of normal time had elapsed) in a 2–1 away defeat of Championnat de France Amateur side Bergerac Périgord FC in the round of 16.

Lokomotiv Moscow

On 23 August 2017, Eder joined Russian Premier League club FC Lokomotiv Moscow in a season-long loan with a buyout option. On 5 May 2018, he scored the winning goal in the 87th minute from Vladislav Ignatyev's cross against FC Zenit Saint Petersburg in a 1–0 victory, which helped to grant his team their first league title since 2004.

Eder moved to the RZD Arena on 16 July 2018, on a permanent basis. He ended that season as a national cup winner, scoring a penalty to open a 4–1 home win over FC Yenisey Krasnoyarsk in the last 16 on 31 October. On 6 July, he was a substitute in the 3–2 defeat of FC Zenit Saint Petersburg in the 2019 Russian Super Cup.

Eder scored for the first time in the UEFA Champions League on 21 October 2020, in a 2–2 away draw against FC Red Bull Salzburg in the group stage. He won the cup again at the end of the season.

Al Raed
On 23 September 2021, free agent Eder signed a contract of undisclosed length with Al Raed FC in the Saudi Professional League.

International career

Eder chose to represent Portugal internationally. After impressive club performances for Braga, he was first called up by the national team in August 2012 for a match against Luxembourg for the 2014 FIFA World Cup qualifiers, but remained an unused substitute in the 2–1 away win on 7 September. He made his debut four days later in the same competition, replacing Hélder Postiga in the dying minutes of a 3–0 home victory over Azerbaijan.

On 19 May 2014, Eder was named in the final 23-man squad for the tournament in Brazil. He made his debut in the competition on 16 June, replacing injured Hugo Almeida in the first half of a 0–4 group stage loss to Germany. In the second game, a 2–2 draw against the United States, he replaced another injured striker early on, this time Postiga.

Eder's first international goal came on his 18th cap, the only goal in a friendly defeat of Italy at the Stade de Genève on 16 June 2015. He was selected by Fernando Santos for his UEFA Euro 2016 squad, appearing in three matches as a substitute and scoring the only goal in the final to help defeat hosts France after extra time.

Eder was not picked for the 2017 FIFA Confederations Cup squad, being replaced by Porto's André Silva. He was included in a preliminary 35-man list for the 2018 World Cup, but did not make the final cut.

Style of play
Eder is a strong, hard-working and well-rounded striker, with a solid first touch. Usually deployed as a centre forward, he excels in the air due to his height and powerful physique, although he is also capable of playing in other offensive positions due to his ability to hold up the ball with his back to goal and play-off his teammates.

Career statistics

Club

International

Scores and results list Portugal's goal tally first, score column indicates score after each Eder goal.

Honours
Académica
Taça de Portugal: 2011–12

Braga
Taça da Liga: 2012–13

Lokomotiv Moscow
Russian Premier League: 2017–18
Russian Cup: 2018–19, 2020–21
Russian Super Cup: 2019

Portugal
UEFA European Championship: 2016

Orders
 Commander of the Order of Merit

References

External links

1987 births
Living people
Bissau-Guinean emigrants to Portugal
Portuguese sportspeople of Bissau-Guinean descent
Black Portuguese sportspeople
Sportspeople from Bissau
Portuguese footballers
Bissau-Guinean footballers
Association football forwards
Primeira Liga players
Segunda Divisão players
F.C. Oliveira do Hospital players
G.D. Tourizense players
Associação Académica de Coimbra – O.A.F. players
S.C. Braga players
Premier League players
Swansea City A.F.C. players
Ligue 1 players
Lille OSC players
Russian Premier League players
FC Lokomotiv Moscow players
Saudi Professional League players
Al-Raed FC players
Portugal international footballers
2014 FIFA World Cup players
UEFA Euro 2016 players
UEFA European Championship-winning players
Portuguese expatriate footballers
Bissau-Guinean expatriate footballers
Expatriate footballers in Wales
Expatriate footballers in France
Expatriate footballers in Russia
Expatriate footballers in Saudi Arabia
Portuguese expatriate sportspeople in Wales
Portuguese expatriate sportspeople in France
Portuguese expatriate sportspeople in Russia
Portuguese expatriate sportspeople in Saudi Arabia
Bissau-Guinean expatriate sportspeople in Wales
Bissau-Guinean expatriate sportspeople in France
Bissau-Guinean expatriate sportspeople in Russia
Bissau-Guinean expatriate sportspeople in Saudi Arabia
Commanders of the Order of Merit (Portugal)